Tate is an English, gender-neutral given name and nickname meaning "Cheerful".

Notable people with the given name "Tate" include
Tate Adams (1922–2018), Northern Ireland-Australian artist
Tate Armstrong (born 1955), American basketball player
Tate Campbell (born 2002), English footballer
Tate Donovan (born 1963), American actor
Tate Fogleman (born 2000), American stock car racer
Tate Forcier (born 1990), American football player
Tate George (born 1968), American basketball player
Tate Houston (1924–1974), American saxophonist
Tate Jackson (born 1997), American swimmer
Tate Kobang (born 1992), American rapper
Tate Makgoe (born 1963), South African politician
Tate Martell (born 1998), American football player
Tate McDermott (born 1998), Australian rugby union footballer
Tate McRae (born 2003), Canadian singer-songwriter
Tate Moseley (born 1977), Australian rugby league footballer
Tate C. Page (1908–1984), American football player
Tate Randle (born 1959), American football player
Tate Reeves (born 1974), American politician
Tate Robertson (born 1997), American soccer player
Tate Russell (born 1999), Australian footballer
Tate Schmitt (born 1997), American soccer player
Tate Smith (born 1981), Australian canoeist
Tate Steinsiek (born 1980), American makeup artist
Tate Stevens (born 1975), American singer
Tate Taylor (born 1969), American filmmaker
Tate Westbrook, American naval officer
Tate Wilkinson (1739–1803), English actor

See also
Tate (surname), a page for people with the surname "Tate"

Other

English unisex given names
English-language unisex given names
Lists of people by nickname